Kenneth Patrick Jordan Sr. (June 18, 1912 – October 14, 1994) was an American professional basketball player. He played in the National Basketball League for the Cincinnati Comellos in eight games during the 1937–38 season. He also competed in the Amateur Athletic Union and independent leagues. Jordan lettered in football and basketball at Xavier University, and spent one season (1937–38) as an assistant coach for the basketball team.

References

1912 births
1994 deaths
Amateur Athletic Union men's basketball players
American men's basketball players
Basketball coaches from California
Basketball players from California
Cincinnati Comellos players
Forwards (basketball)
Xavier Musketeers football players
Xavier Musketeers men's basketball coaches
Xavier Musketeers men's basketball players